is a railway station in Namba, Naniwa Ward, Osaka, Japan, adjacent to Namba Station (Nankai Railway, Osaka Subway) and Ōsaka Namba Station (Kintetsu, Hanshin Railway) operated by the West Japan Railway Company (JR West).

JR Namba is the western terminus of the Kansai Main Line (Yamatoji Line).

Layout 
The station has two underground island platforms serving four tracks.

Platforms

History 

It was renamed JR Namba on September 4, 1994, in collaboration with the opening of Kansai International Airport. New underground facilities opened on March 22, 1996, and replaced the former above-ground station.

Future plans 

The tracks from the Kansai Main Line are expected to be extended north from this station by 2031 with the completion of the Naniwasuji Line. The new line is to be routed through central Osaka and will terminate at new underground platforms at Osaka Station.

Surrounding area 

 Osaka City Air Terminal (OCAT)
 Minatomachi River Place
 FM Osaka
 Sankei Shimbun Osaka Head Office

Bus stops 
 Osaka City Air Terminal (OCAT)
 JR Namba ekimae (Osaka City Bus)

See also
 List of railway stations in Japan

References 

Railway stations in Osaka Prefecture
Railway stations in Japan opened in 1889